The Amigoe is a Dutch-language daily newspaper with editorials in Curaçao and whose audience are the peoples of the former Netherlands Antilles, specifically Curaçao and Aruba. The newspaper is one of the most widely read dailies in Aruba.

The newspaper was founded on December 1883 under the name of Amigoe di Curaçao by the Dominican Order. It began its circulation in Aruba in 1884. The edition used to be weekly until 1935, when it started to be published two times each week. In 1941, the newspaper became a daily newspaper (except Sunday) issued by the Catholic Church. 

The online version of the newspaper was founded on January 8, 1998.

See also 
Antilliaans Dagblad

References

External links 
 Amigoe Official Webpage

Dutch-language newspapers
Newspapers published in Aruba
1883 establishments in Curaçao and Dependencies
Newspapers established in 1883